Constantin Brătescu (March 8, 1892 – April 13, 1971) was a Romanian major-general during World War II. 

He was awarded the Order of the Star of Romania, Officer class, on June 8, 1940. In 1941, he served first as Chief Propaganda Section General Staff (Romania's Propaganda Minister) and then as a Romanian liaison officer to the German Military Mission, meaning that he served as a German military officer during Operation Barbarossa and the Axis Invasion of the Soviet Union. Starting in 1942 Brătescu was a Romanian General Officer (at the rank of Major-General) and commanded the 1st Cavalry Division throughout the campaign against the Soviets, fighting in such engagements as Operation Barbarossa, Case Blue, and the Battle of Stalingrad. At Stalingrad, Brătescu's 1st Cavalry Division was subordinated to the 4th Army Corps, under the command of General Constantin Sănătescu, which in turn was part of the Romanian 3rd Army, under the command of General Petre Dumitrescu. Following the surrender of Friedrich Paulus' 6th Army at the Battle of Stalingrad, Brătescu became a prisoner of war and was held captive in the Soviet Union from 1943 to 1948. 

During a visit to Moscow in April 1946, the composer George Enescu and his wife, Princess Maruca Cantacuzino, asked the Soviet authorities to free Brătescu and a fellow prisoner, General .  Brătescu was released in 1948, after five years of imprisonment, and subsequently retired from active service. He died in 1971, at the age of seventy-nine.

References

1892 births
1971 deaths
Romanian Land Forces generals
Romanian military personnel of World War II
Officers of the Order of the Star of Romania
Romanian prisoners of war
World War II prisoners of war held by the Soviet Union